Afzelius is a Swedish surname. Notable people with the surname include:

 Adam Afzelius (1750–1837), Swedish naturalist
 Arvid Afzelius (1857–1923), Swedish dermatologist
 Arvid August Afzelius (1785–1871), Swedish poet and historian
 Björn Afzelius (1947–1999), Swedish singer
 Johan Afzelius (1753–1837), Swedish chemist
 Jon Arvid Afzelius (1856–1918), Swedish linguist
 Per von Afzelius (1760–1843), Swedish medicine
 Ronnie Afzelius (1972–present), Swedish entrepreneur

Sources 
 Biographies in Swedish language

Swedish-language surnames